Rüdiger Noack (born 30 November 1944) is a German ice hockey player, who competed for SG Dynamo Weißwasser. He won the bronze medal with the East Germany national ice hockey team at the 1966 European Championships. Poindl also competed for East Germany at the 1968 Winter Olympics in Grenoble, scoring one goal and two assists in seven games played.

References

1944 births
Living people
German ice hockey right wingers
People from Weißwasser
Ice hockey players at the 1968 Winter Olympics
Olympic ice hockey players of East Germany
Sportspeople from Saxony